Michael Allen McCollum (born 1946 in Phoenix, Arizona) is an American science fiction author and aerospace engineer. He graduated from Arizona State University, where he studied aerospace propulsion and nuclear engineering. He is employed by Honeywell in Tempe, Arizona. In 1997, he founded Sci Fi - Arizona, one of the first author-owned-and-operated virtual bookstores on the Internet. He also conducts writers workshops. Most of his novels have been published as audio books by Audible Inc. They have also been translated into German.

Bibliography

Makers series
Life Probe (1983, Del Rey)
Procyon's Promise (1985, Del Rey)

Antares series
Antares Dawn (1986, Del Rey)
Antares Passage (1987, Del Rey)
Antares Victory (2002, SciFi Arizona)

Gibraltar series
Gibraltar Earth (1999, SciFi Arizona)
Gibraltar Sun (2006, SciFi Arizona)
Gibraltar Stars (2009, SciFi Arizona)

Standalone novels
 A Greater Infinity (1982, Del Rey)
 Thunderstrike (1989, Del Rey)
 The Clouds of Saturn (1991, Del Rey)
 The Sails of Tau Ceti (1992, Del Rey)
 Euclid's Wall (2012, SciFi Arizona)
 Lost Earth (2020, SciFi - Arizona)

Collections and short stories
 Gridlock and Other Stories (1998, SciFi Arizona)

Non-fiction
 The Art of Writing, Volume 1 (2000) 
 The Art of Writing, Volume 2 (2000) 
 The Art of Science Fiction, Volume 1 (2000) 
 The Art of Science Fiction, Volume 2 (2000) 
 The Astrogator's Handbook (2000)

References

External links
Literature by and about Michael McCollum in the catalog of the German National Library

1946 births
Living people
Novelists from Arizona
20th-century American novelists
21st-century American novelists
American male novelists
20th-century American male writers
21st-century American male writers